Maryland Route 191 (MD 191) is a state highway in the U.S. state of Maryland. Known for most of its length as Bradley Boulevard, the highway runs  from MD 190 in Potomac east to MD 185 in Chevy Chase. MD 191 serves an affluent area with many golf courses as it connects Potomac and Chevy Chase by way of an S-shaped path through Bethesda in southwestern Montgomery County. Bradley Lane, the name for the Chevy Chase portion of the highway, was paved by 1910. This included the segment of the lane between MD 185 and MD 186, which was removed from the state highway in the 1940s. The remainder of MD 191 was constructed along mostly new alignment through Bethesda and Potomac in the early 1920s. The highway originally continued beyond its present western terminus and looped south along Persimmon Tree Road to Cabin John. MD 191 was expanded to a divided highway between what is now MD 355 and MD 614 in two portions in the 1940s and 1960s. The highway was relocated at its Persimmon Tree Road crossing of Interstate 495 (I-495) when the freeway was built in the early 1960s. The Cabin John–Potomac portion of MD 191 was removed from the state highway system in 1999.

Route description

MD 191 begins at an intersection with MD 190 (River Road) southeast of the center of Potomac. Bradley Boulevard continues west as a county highway along the edge of Congressional Country Club to its end at Persimmon Tree Road, which connects Potomac with Cabin John. The named road's terminus is near another golf course, the TPC Potomac at Avenel Farm. MD 191 heads northeast as a two-lane undivided road along the edge of another part of Congressional Country Club and crosses Cabin John Creek before the route intersects Seven Locks Road. The highway continues east past Bethesda Country Club and temporarily expands to a wide two-lane divided highway around its overpass of I-495 (Capital Beltway). MD 191 passes to the north of Burning Tree Club, then curves southeast through the western parts of Bethesda. At Huntington Parkway, which leads east to MD 187 (Old Georgetown Road), the state highway veers south and intersects MD 188 (Wilson Lane).

MD 191 veers east and expands to a six-lane divided highway at its intersection with MD 614 (Goldsboro Road). The highway intersects Arlington Road then passes under the Capital Crescent Trail; two of the routes's six lanes become parking lanes east of the trail underpass. MD 191's divided highway section ends at its intersection with MD 355 (Wisconsin Avenue) at the southern end of downtown Bethesda. The state highway continues east as Bradley Lane, a narrow two-lane undivided street that passes between Chevy Chase Country Club to the south and the town of Chevy Chase to the north. MD 191 reaches its eastern terminus at MD 185 (Connecticut Avenue) at the eastern end of the country club and the town. Bradley Lane continues east as a street that separates the town of Chevy Chase Village to the south from the village of Chevy Chase Section Three to the north. The street continues to MD 186 (Brookville Road), then after a jog on that state highway continues two blocks to a dead end in the village of Martin's Additions.

History
Bradley Lane was paved as a macadam road from Wisconsin Avenue east to Brookville Road by 1910. The remainder of the original extent of MD 191 was constructed between 1921 and 1923. The highway was built as a macadam road along existing Persimmon Tree Road from MacArthur Boulevard in Cabin John north to Potomac and east along Bradley Boulevard to River Road. MD 191 was constructed as a concrete road along a new alignment from River Road to Seven Locks Road. The highway was surfaced with macadam along an existing road from Seven Locks Road to what is today Huntington Parkway, then along new alignment south and east to the intersection of Wisconsin Avenue and Bradley Lane. The portion of Bradley Lane from MD 193 (now MD 185) to MD 186 was included in the state highway system as of 1939, but it is not clear when it was removed. State maps no longer show Bradley Lane east of MD 193 by 1946, but it is labelled a state highway on federal maps in the 1960s.

MD 191 was expanded to a divided highway from U.S. Route 240 (now MD 355) west to the Baltimore and Ohio Railroad crossing (now the Capital Crescent Trail) by 1945. The railroad's bridge across the highway was in place by 1951. The divided highway was extended west to near Goldsboro Road by 1962. MD 191's bridges across I-495 were constructed in 1962 when the Beltway was under construction. The Bradley Boulevard bridge and its approaches were built as a divided highway. MD 191 and Eggert Drive were relocated at the site of the Persimmon Tree Road bridge and a cut-off county road was built to form a four-way intersection just north of the Beltway bridge. The state highway continued to follow the old alignment of Persimmon Tree Road (now Persimmon Tree Lane) instead of the cut-off until 1999. That year, MD 191 was truncated at MD 190 and the highway along Persimmon Tree Road and the portion of Bradley Boulevard west of MD 190 were transferred to Montgomery County maintenance in a highway swap to designate Great Seneca Highway as MD 119.

Junction list

See also

References

External links

 MDRoads: MD 191

191
Maryland Route 191